The Mad Magician is a 1954 American horror film in 3D, directed by John Brahm starring Vincent Price, Mary Murphy and Eva Gabor. It was produced and distributed by Columbia Pictures, with a release in 3-D to build on the craze started by films such as House of Wax (1953), which also starred Price.

Plot
Don Gallico (Vincent Price) is a magician, master of disguise, and inventor of stage-magic effects in the late 19th century aspiring to become a star magician under the stage name Gallico the Great. Disguised as The Great Rinaldi, a headlining rival magician, Mr. Gallico performs a number of magic tricks successfully, building up to the reveal of his latest invention, the buzz-saw, an illusion that "severs" the head of the magician's assistant Karen Lee (Mary Murphy). Before Mr. Gallico can perform the buzz-saw illusion, the curtains come down to stop the performance. Businessman Ross Ormond (Donald Randolph) and his lawyer serve Mr. Gallico a cease and desist order against the performance of the buzz-saw trick much to the anger of Mr. Gallico. Ms. Lee's boyfriend, police detective Lt. Alan Bruce (Patrick O'Neal), is asked by her to intervene in the dispute between Mr. Gallico and Mr. Ormond. Mr. Gallico informs the detective that he signed a contract with Mr. Ormond's Illusions, Inc., a magician's trick provider, to invent new tricks. Mr. Ormond claims to own all work created by Mr. Gallico, not just the tricks produced for Illusions, Inc., Mr. Gallico's understanding.

The next day at Mr. Gallico's work area within the Illusions, Inc. warehouse, detective Mr. Bruce reviews Mr. Gallico's contract and explains that the contract is as Mr. Ormond stated: anything Mr. Gallico invents is the property of Illusions, Inc. As the detective is leaving, he asks Mr. Gallico to tell Ms. Lee where and when to meet him for dinner. Just then Mr. Ormond and the real Great Rinaldi (John Emery) arrive.

Mr. Ormond and The Great Rinaldi are shown the buzz-saw illusion's inner workings and ruminate on the performance of the trick by The Great Rinaldi and not by Mr. Gallico, the trick's inventor. Gallico grows angry. The Great Rinaldi departs leaving Mr. Ormond and Mr. Gallico to discuss their business arrangement; Mr. Ormond dismisses Mr. Gallico's anger by explaining that Mr. Gallico was presented the opportunity to invent under the contract and that Mr. Ormond's wooing of Mr. Gallico's wife Claire (Eva Gabor) was due to her rich needs and Mr. Ormond's ability to provision them, something that Mr. Gallico was never able to do. Incensed, Mr. Gallico attacks Mr. Ormond and forces him into the buzz-saw on functional (non-illusion) mode and decapitates him.

His crime is almost revealed when Mr. Ormond's severed head is mistakenly taken for a trip with Gallico's assistant Ms. Lee and Mr. Bruce.

Gallico then impersonates Ormond to rent an apartment from Alice Prentiss (Lenita Lane), an author of mystery novels. Gallico disposes of Ormond's body, but is again forced to murder when his ex-wife Claire discovers the impersonation. Prentiss comes forth as a witness to the crime, but identifies Ormond as Claire's murderer.  Gallico then invites the Prentisses to a preview performance of his sensational new illusion, The Crematorium, in which he appears to be incinerated in a fiery furnace. Afterwards, the Great Rinaldi reveals himself, and Gallico briefly confronts him before asking the Prentisses how they liked his newest illusion, and they discuss the realism and the safety measures taken to prevent the performer from burning to death. When Alice leaves with the Prentisses, the Great Rinaldi reveals his intentions to Gallico. Gallico tries to warn him not to try to plagiarize it, but Rinaldi blackmails him by revealing his ability to deduce Gallico's involvement in Ormond's disappearance. After Rinaldi's next show, Alan Bruce tries to get his fingerprints to compare them to Ormond's, only for Rinaldi to rudely turn him away. He then unmasks himself upon Bruce's departure, revealing Gallico's face, implying something terrible happened to Rinaldi.

Later, Bruce stops by the apartment to obtain Gallico's fingerprints, and Gallico appears to cooperate, only to knock him out and prepare to burn him to death, confessing his role in the deaths of Ormond, his wife, and the Great Rinaldi, revealing that Rinaldi had been incinerated in the furnace. Meanwhile, the novelist Prentiss realizes her boarder, and the murderer, was Gallico and not Ormond. The two, along with the assistant Karen, band together for an ultimate confrontation with Gallico, ending with Bruce knocking him unconscious long enough for him to burn to death in the furnace.

Cast

Reception

Dennis Schwartz from Ozus' World Movie Reviews awarded the film a grade B, writing "It was cheesy fun with a delightfully villainous Vincent, but the whole act was too tawdry and incredible to be swallowed whole and the melodramatic plot points were too contrived and the demented scenario too hokey." On his website Fantastic Movie Musings and Ramblings, Dave Sindelar gave the film a negative review. Sindelar stated that the film felt cobbled together, and lacked the mood and ambiance of its predecessor. TV Guide gave the film 2/5 stars, calling it "vastly inferior 3-D rip-off of Price's surprisingly successful 3-D shocker HOUSE OF WAX". Jay Seaver from eFilmCritic awarded the film an average rating of 3/5 stars, calling its scenario "straight-facedly silly", but stated that it was still entertaining even though it was inferior to its predecessor.

References

External links

1954 films
1954 horror films
American 3D films
American horror films
Columbia Pictures films
Films directed by John Brahm
Films scored by Emil Newman
Films about magic and magicians
1954 3D films
Films scored by Arthur Lange
1950s English-language films
1950s American films